San Diego County Water Authority (SDCWA) is a wholesale supplier of water to the roughly western third of San Diego County, California.  The Water Authority was formed in 1944 by the California State Legislature. SDCWA serves 24 member agencies with 36 Board of Director members. In addition to local water sources, water is imported from the Colorado River and Sacramento-San Joaquin River Delta through The Metropolitan Water District of Southern California. SDCWA is the sole recipient of fresh water produced by the Claude "Bud" Lewis Carlsbad Desalination Plant.

History
Spanish missionaries in the San Diego area in 1769 noticed that the local water supply was in need of infrastructure, such as dams and aqueducts, to increase supply to the area. One of the first water projects in San Diego was the Old Mission Dam which preceded the erection of six privately funded dams between 1887 and 1897, all of which are still exist today. Through an act of California state legislation, the San Diego County water authority was created in 1944 to oversee San Diego County’s water rights over the Colorado River. In 1952 San Diego started receiving water from the State Water Project from pipelines built by SDCWA. The Capital Improvement Program (CIP) was created in 1989 to lower the need for imported water to the region. In 2003 the Quantification Settlement Agreement was signed with the Imperial Irrigation District, the single largest user of the Colorado River in Southern California. SDCWA funded repairs to leaky canals which included lining canals with concrete. For 110 years, the water district will receive  of water via this agreement. In 2015 SDCWA started supplementing their supply with water from the desalination plant in Carlsbad. By 2035 it is projected that local water will meet the region's water demands.

Water sources
San Diego County Water Authority supplies its members both imported and local water resources. Imported water used by SDCWA comes from the Sacramento-San Joaquin rivers through State Water Project aqueducts , and from the Colorado River (through the Colorado River Aqueduct). California is one of seven states which receive water from The Colorado River. Around 17% of the water supplied through SDCWA comes from the State Water Project. Local sources from the Metropolitan Water District include recycled water, groundwater pumping, and desalinated water from the Carlsbad Desalination Plant. The rates are among the highest in Southern California.

Governance
Members served by SDCWA include cities, water districts, irrigation districts, municipal water districts, public utility districts, and a military base.

The Water Authority was formed in 1944 by the California State Legislature and operates under the County Water Authority Act, which can be found in the California State Water Code. SDCWA head quarters are located in Kearny Mesa. Current leadership includes Jim Madaffer (Chair), Gary Crocher (Vice Chair), and Christy Guerin (Secretary).

The following agencies purchase water from the Water Authority:

 Carlsbad Municipal Water District
 City of Del Mar
 City of Escondido
 Fallbrook Public Utility District
 Helix Water District
 Lakeside Water District
 National City (Member of Sweetwater Authority)
 City of Oceanside
 Olivenhain Municipal Water District
 Otay Water District
 Padre Dam Municipal Water District
 Camp Pendleton Marine Corps Base
 City of Poway
 Rainbow Municipal Water District
 Ramona Municipal Water District
 Rincon Del Diablo Municipal Water District
 City of San Diego
 San Dieguito Water District
 Santa Fe Irrigation District
 South Bay Irrigation District (Member of Sweetwater Authority)
 Sweetwater Authority
 Vallecitos Water District
 Valley Center Municipal Water District
 Vista Irrigation District
 Yuima Municipal Water District

Current Projects 
SDCWA officials are currently working at the state and federal level to maintain the latest knowledge of legislative decisions affecting San Diego's water supply. The Capital Improvement Program (CIP) has been an ongoing project since 1989 and works to establish infrastructure to support regional water needs. A current project of CIP is the $1.5 billion Emergency and Carryover Storage Project which is a fail-safe plan in case of a lapse in imported water supply. The Emergency and Carryover Storage Project consists of dams, reservoirs, pipelines, and pumping stations to ensure continued supply to the region. In efforts to supplement imported water supply, SDCWA helped to facilitate the opening of the Claude "Bud" Lewis Carlsbad Desalination Plant in 2015. Currently the largest desalination plant world wide, producing 50 million gallons of water every day. In January 2020, the 2020 Urban Water Management Plan was developed with 6 elements outlining future forecast, savings, supply and reliability, and planning and shortage analysis in the region that SDCWA manages.

Consumer Programs 
SDCWA has water saving incentive programs for both residential and commercial consumers.

Residential Programs 
Residential programs include water saving tips for both indoor and outdoor uses, as well as gardening demonstrations. Residential incentives include rebates for high-efficiency washers and toilets for indoor use, and rebates on sprinkler nozzles, rain barrels, and turf replacement for outdoor water use.

Business Programs 
For businesses, the SDCWA has incentives including both indoor and outdoor water efficiency rebates and programs including their community partnering program run through the Metropolitan Water Districts Innovative Conservation Program (ICP). ICP does work to evaluate water saving technology and their efficiencies. The ICP provides funding with the help of the U.S. Bureau of Reclamation (USBR), Environmental Protection Agency (EPA), Southern Nevada Water Authority (SNWA), the Central Arizona Project (CAP), the Southern California Gas Company, and Western Resource Advocates.

Contractor Programs 
For contractors the SDCWA has a WaterSmart Contractor Incentive Program (WSCIP), where participants can purchase water saving devices to use in their watering systems.

Educational Programs 
SDCWA also runs water conservation programs in both educational and practical applications.

References

External links
 Official San Diego County Water Authority website

Government of San Diego County, California
Water management authorities in California
Water companies of the United States
County government agencies in California